Larisa Viktorovna Viktorova  (born 5 September 1943) is a retired Russian swimmer who won two medals at the 1958 European Aquatics Championships. She also participated in the 1960 Summer Olympics and finished eighth in the 4×100 m medley event. Between 1958 and 1964 she set 21 national records and won 15 medals at national championships (8 gold), in backstroke, freestyle and medley relay events. After retirement she worked at the Baikal-Amur Mainline and as a swimming coach. In the 1990s she moved to the United States.

References

1943 births
Living people
Russian female backstroke swimmers
Russian female freestyle swimmers
Soviet female backstroke swimmers
Soviet female freestyle swimmers
Olympic swimmers of the Soviet Union
Swimmers at the 1960 Summer Olympics
European Aquatics Championships medalists in swimming
Universiade medalists in swimming
Universiade gold medalists for the Soviet Union
Medalists at the 1961 Summer Universiade